The 2015–16 season  was Atlético Madrid's 85th season in existence and the club's 79th season in La Liga, the top league of Spanish football. Atlético competed in La Liga, Copa del Rey and  UEFA Champions League. The season for the club began on 25 July 2015 and ended on 28 May 2016.

Kits

Supplier: Nike / First Sponsor: Plus500

Season overview

June

On 19 June, it was announced that Mario Mandžukić would sign for Juventus. On 22 June, the signing of Mandžukić for a fee of €19 million was officially confirmed. On 22 June, it was confirmed that Atlético were close to agreeing a deal to sign Luciano Vietto from Villarreal. It was also confirmed that Léo Baptistão would be loaned to Villarreal. On 23 June, the agent of Jackson Martínez confirmed that Atlético had agreed a €35 million deal with Porto. A few days later, Martínez confirmed that he was set to join Atlético. On 24 June, Atlético officially presented its new home kit for the 2015–16 season. On 30 June, Internazionale confirmed Miranda's move.

July

On 1 July, Atlético announced the departure of centre back Miranda to Italian Serie A club Internazionale. On 6 July, Arda Turan departed, signing for Liga rivals Barcelona for €34 million. On 7 July, Atlético official signed of Luciano Vietto from Villarreal. On 8 July, Atlético completed the transfer of centre back Toby Alderweireld to Tottenham Hotspur. On the same day, Atlético presented its away kit for the 2015–16 season. On 10 July, the club confirmed the signing of winger Yannick Carrasco from French club Monaco. On 14 July, the schedule for the 2015–16 La Liga season was released. On 20 July, Atlético reached an agreement with Fiorentina for the transfer of Montenegrin international centre back Stefan Savić. Two days later, both clubs officially confirmed that Mario Suárez has joined Fiorentina. Atlético also confirmed the signing of Bernard Mensah from Portuguese side Vitória de Guimarães; he was immediately loaned to Getafe for the entirety of the 2015–16 season. On 25 July, Atlético played its first friendly game of the pre-season, prevailing 2–0 over Numancia in the Jésus Gil Trophy; Lucas Hernandez and Ángel Correa both scored. On 28 July, Atlético confirmed the return of left back Filipe Luís after one year spent in the English Premier League with Chelsea. On the same day, Atlético played its second friendly game of the pre-season and won 2–0 against Real Oviedo, with goals Antoine Griezmann and Fernando Torres. On 29 July, Atlético, with 22 players, prepared to play two friendlies in Japan and China for the LFP World Challenge tour.

August

1 August marked the first match of the tour, in Japan, where Atlético defeated Sagan Tosu 4–1 in penalties, the club's third win of the pre-season. Its second, and last match, in Asia was played on 4 August in China, with Atlético defeating Shanghai SIPG 0–3 through an Antoine Griezmann goal and a double from Fernando Torres. After the tour, on 8 August, Atlético played three matches, the first two of which were 45-minute morning matches against Guadalajara (0–0) and Leganés, which handed Atlético its first pre-season defeat. In the day's third match, played in the evening, Atlético defeated Real Sociedad 2–0 through a goal by Markel Bergara and a strike by Griezmann. On 13 August, Atlético confirmed that Mexican striker Raúl Jiménez officially signed with Portuguese club Benfica. On 14 and 15 August, Atlético played its last two friendly matches of the pre-season, contending in the Ramón de Carranza Trophy. In the semi-finals, the club defeated Cádiz on penalties (2–4), advancing to the finals. Atlético then dispatched Real Betis with three goals from José Giménez, Jackson Martínez and Ángel Correa, thereby claiming the side's tenth Carranza Trophy. Atlético finished its pre-season with a record of 7–1–1, scoring 13 goals and conceding two.

In its first league match, on 22 August, Atlético beat Las Palmas 1–0 with goal from Griezmann. On 27 August, Atlético were drawn into Group C of the Champions League alongside Portuguese champions Benfica, Turkish champions Galatasaray and Kazakh champions Astana. The next day, the club reached an agreement with River Plate for the purchase of Matías Kranevitter. He was officially announced three days later, but he will join the club after playing 2015 FIFA Club World Cup.

Atlético won its second-straight Liga match after defeating Sevilla at the Sánchez Pizjuán 3–0, with goals from Koke, Gabi and Jackson Martínez. On 31 August, the last day of the summer transfer window, after a transfer request, Raúl García signed a four-year contract with Athletic Bilbao.

September

On 12 September, Atlético fell to Barcelona 1–2 at the Vicente Calderón, with Fernando Torres scoring for Atlético. On 15 September, Atlético played its first match in the Champions League group stage, winning 2–0 over Galatasaray, with two goals from Antoine Griezmann. With goals in the second-half from Ángel Correa and Fernando Torres, Atlético has achieved an important victory by closing a week against Eibar.

Three days later, Atlético beat Getafe through two Griezmann goals at the beginning and of the match. In its next match, however, Atlético suffered its second loss in La Liga at the hands of Villarreal, with a goal by Léo Baptistão deciding the match. In its second match in the Champions League, Atlético lost 1–2 at home to Benfica; the only goal scored from the home team came from Ángel Correa.

October

In the first Madrid Derby of the season, on 4 October at the Vicente Calderón, Karim Benzema gave Real Madrid the lead, only for Luciano Vietto to later equalize, salvaged a 1–1 draw for Atlético. On 16 October, Atlético was drawn in the round of 32 of the 2015–16 Copa del Rey against Reus.

On 18 October, Antoine Griezmann and Yannick Carrasco both scored to secure a 2–0 victory over Real Sociedad. On 21 October, Atlético played its third match of the Champions League group stage, defeating Astana 4–0. Saúl, Jackson Martínez, Óliver and a Denys Dedechko own goal secured all three points.

On 25 October, Jackson Martínez and Yannick Carrasco both scored to ensure a 2–1 win over Valencia. In the tenth round of league, on 30 October, Atlético played Deportivo. Tiago gave his team the lead, but Lucas Pérez levelled for Deportivo, with the match finishing in a 1–1 draw.

November

Matchday 4 for Atlético in the Champions League against Astana ended in a 0–0 away draw. Back in La Liga, on 8 November Atético defeated Sporting de Gijón 1–0 from an Antoine Griezmann goal in the 93rd minute. The side, on 22 November, then played a match against Real Betis, winning 0–1 away with a goal by Koke. With the win, the team moved to second in the Liga table.

A double from Griezmann—as in the first leg was enough to down Turkish side Galatasaray, 2–0, in the Champions League group stage at home, ensuring Atlético's progression to the round of 16. Griezmann then scored again as Atlético beat Espanyol at the Vicente Calderón, 1–0.

December

To begin its Copa del Rey campaign, Atlético played its first leg match away at Reus. Reus netted first through a Fran Carbià goal in the 30th minute, but Luciano Vietto and Saúl scored the match's next to goals, ensuring a 1–2 win. Atlético then beat Granada 0–2 away through goals from defender Diego Godín and Antoine Griezmann. This was the team's sixth-consecutive win.

Goals from Saúl and Vietto away against Benfica in the last matchday of the Champions League group stage ensured first place in Group C for Atlético, with the Portuguese club placing second. In La Liga, Aymeric Laporte put Athletic Bilbao ahead but just before half-time in Atlético's next match, only for Saúl to level it just before half-time. Griezmann, with a great goal, decided the match in the 76th minute to put the club at the top of the table after the 2–1 home win.

In Monday, on 14 December, was the draw for the round of 16 of the Champions League. The team will play against PSV.

After the first-leg win away at Reus in the Copa del Rey, Thomas scored the second leg's only goal for Atlético (1–0) to send the club through to the round of 16, 3–1 on aggregate. Away at Málaga on 20 December, however, Atlético lost 1–0 after Charles scored the match's only goal for Málaga. On 30 December, Atlético responded with an important 0–2 away win over Rayo Vallecano to finish the 2015 calendar year with goals from Ángel Correa and Antoine Griezmann.

January

On 1 January 2016, the first day of the winter transfer window, Atlético announced an agreement with Celta de Vigo for the transfer of Argentine midfielder Augusto Fernández. The new year for the team began with a 1–0 home victory against Levante; Thomas scored the only goal. On 4 January, Matías Kranevitter was presented as an Atlético player. He joined the team after his initial loan to River Plate.

The first leg of the Copa del Rey round of 16, played on 6 January, ended in a 1–1 draw with Rayo Vallecano. Rayo initially took the lead through Nacho, but midfielder Saúl tied it for Atlético in the 67th minute. The club followed-up with its third-straight Liga victory over Celta on 10 January. Antoine Griezmann and Yannick Carrasco both netted in the second half for Atlético to secure the 0–2 away victory at Balaídos.

In the second leg of the Copa del Rey's round of 16, played on 14 January, Atlético overwhelmed Rayo Vallecano 3–0 at the Vicente Calderón, securing a 4–1 aggregate victory and progression to the quarter-finals. Two goals from Antoine Griezmann and one strike from Ángel Correa secured the victory. Three days later, on 17 January, a great goal from Filipe Luís and double from Griezmann was enough to dispatch Las Palmas 0–3 away at the Gran Canaria. On 20 January, Atlético played-out a hard-fought 0–0 draw away at Celta in the first leg of the Copa del Rey quarter-finals.

In La Liga on 24 January, Sevilla held Atlético to a 0–0 draw at home. Despite goals from Antoine Griezmann and Ángel Correa, Atlético fell to Celta 2–3 in the away leg of the Copa del Rey quarter-finals, knocking the club out of the cup 2–3 on aggregate. In the next match, in La Liga on 30 January, Koke initially put Atlético ahead in the tenth minute in an away match at Barcelona, but first-half goals from Lionel Messi and Luis Suárez sent Atlético to its second-straight overall defeat. On 31 January, the final day of the January transfer window period, Atlético reached an agreement with Valencia for the loan of left back Guilherme Siqueira.

February
On 2 February, Atlético and Guangzhou Evergrande reached an agreement for the transfer of the Colombian striker Jackson Martínez for a €42 million transfer fee.
Eibar take a lead at the start of the second half and shortly after, Giménez and Saúl scored the 2–1. Fernando Torres scored the final goal, which was his 100th goal as a player of Atlético.
A goal from Torres at the start of the match was worth three points in Getafe
The match between Atlético and Villarreal was ended without goals.
In first round of the quarterfinals in Champions League Atlético couldn't beat a PSV Eindhoven. Match ended with 0–0. In second Madrid Derby Atlético won against Real Madrid; Griezmann scored.

March
Atlético opened the new month with a 3–0 victory against Real Sociedad with goals from Saúl, Greiezmann and an own goal.
Goals from Griezmann, Carrasco and Torres decided the match a 3–1 victory over Valencia.
Another victory with three goals scored by Atlético. Saúl, Griezmann and Corea sentenced Deportivo.
The round of 16 of the Champions League decided in a penalty shootout and the team will be in the quarter-finals.
On 18 March, in the draw for the quarter-finals of the Champions League, Atlético will face Barcelona.
Griezmann scored, but the team couldn't add a victory over Sporting.

April

Atlético began April with a 5–1 over Betis, with two goals scored by Griezmann and one each for Fernando Torres, Juanfran and Thomas. Atlético then fell away to Barcelona 2–1 in first leg of the quarter-finals of the Champions League, with Torres scoring. Atlético then defeated Espanyol away at the Cornellà-El Prat, 3–1. Goals were scored from Torres, Griezmann and Koke. Two goals from Griezmann over Barcelona then put the team in the semi-finals of the Champions League. On 15 April, in the draw for the semi-finals of the Champions League, Atlético will face Bayern Munich. Koke, Fernando Torres and Correa scored against Granada. Atlético beat Athletic Bilbao with a goal by Torres. Correa decided the match over Málaga. Atlético won the first leg of the semi-final with goal by Saúl against Bayern Munich. Griezmann decided and scored in an important win against Rayo Vallecano.

May

On 3 May, Atlético progressed into the final of the Champions League, although was defeated by 1–2 in Munich, but the team won the tie on away goal. Griezmann scored.

Fernando Torres put the team ahead, but Levante finally won with 1–2.

Atlético won at home stadium over Celta at the last matchday of the league. Torres and Griezmann scored. The team finished in third position.

The season for Atletico Madrid ended on 28 May, with the Champions League final. The match ended with 1–1 after extra time, but Real Madrid won a 5–3 on penalties. Only goal for team scored Carrasco.

Players

Updated 8 June 2016.

Technical staff

Source: Atlético Madrid

Transfers

In

Out

Pre-season and friendlies

Competitions

La Liga

League table

Results by round

Matches

Copa del Rey

Round of 32

Round of 16

Quarter-finals

UEFA Champions League

Group stage

Knockout phase

Round of 16

Quarter-finals

Semi-finals

Final

Statistics

Squad statistics
Match played 28 May 2016.

1 Player from reserve team.

Goalscorers

Assists

Clean sheets
Match played 28 May 2016.

Attendances

Awards

La Liga Manager of the Month

Diego Simeone named Liga BBVA Manager of the Month for November.

La Liga Player of the Month

Koke named Liga BBVA Player of the Month for April.

Zamora Trophy

Jan Oblak won the Zamora Trophy for 2015–16 season for best goalkeeper.

La Liga Awards
Jan Oblak for the best goalkeeper in 2015–16 season.
Diego Godín for the best defender in 2015–16 season.
Antoine Griezmann for the best player and Fans' Five-Star Player in 2015–16 season.
Diego Simeone for the best coach in 2015–16 season.

References

External links

Atlético Madrid seasons
Atletico Madrid
Atletico Madrid